Motueka and Massacre Bay was one of the original parliamentary electorates created for the 1st New Zealand Parliament. It existed from 1853 to 1860 and was represented by three Members of Parliament.

Population centres
The New Zealand Constitution Act 1852, passed by the British government, allowed New Zealand to establish a representative government. The initial 24 New Zealand electorates were defined by Governor George Grey in March 1853. Motueka and Massacre Bay was one of the initial single-member electorates.

Settlements within the electorate were Motueka, Tākaka, and Collingwood. The modern name of Massacre Bay is Golden Bay.

In the 1860 electoral redistribution, the House of Representatives increased the number of representatives by 12, reflecting the immense population growth since the original electorates were established in 1853. The redistribution created 15 additional electorates with between one and three members. The Motueka and Massacre Bay electorate was split up, and about half the area went to the  electorate, and the other half went to the  electorate.

History
During the 1st and 2nd New Zealand Parliament, Motueka and Massacre Bay was represented by three Members of Parliament: Alfred Christopher Picard 1853–55, Charles Parker 1855–56, and Herbert Curtis 1856–60. Picard died on 17 September 1855, only two days after the dissolution of the 1st Parliament. The  was contested by Edward Dodson Salisbury and Charles Parker, with Parker being successful. On nomination day, David Jennings was also nominated but he withdrew prior to the election.

Members

Key

Election results

1855 election

1853 election

Notes

References

Historical electorates of New Zealand
Politics of the Tasman District
1853 establishments in New Zealand
1860 disestablishments in New Zealand